Sven Jodts (born October 14, 1988, in Veurne) is a Belgian former professional cyclist.

Major results

2007
1st Stage 3 Triptyque des Barrages
2008
1st Stage 4 Tour du Haut-Anjou
2009
1st Stage 3 Tour de Moselle
2010
1st Internationale Wielertrofee Jong Maar Moedig
1st Stage 8 Tour de Normandie
3rd Brussel–Opwijk
2011
3rd Beverbeek Classic

References

External links

1988 births
Living people
Belgian male cyclists
People from Veurne
Cyclists from West Flanders